The 2016–17 National Cricket League was the eighteenth edition of the National Cricket League, a first-class cricket competition that was held in Bangladesh. The tournament started on 25 September 2016 and concluded on 6 January 2017. Khulna Division were the defending champions.

Heavy rain affected the first three rounds of matches, with only two matches out of twelve ending in a result other than a draw. The Bangladesh Cricket Board (BCB) announced that all matches scheduled to take place on 14 October 2016 would be delayed until the weather improved. However, there was no improvement in the weather and those matches and future fixtures were postponed due to the upcoming Bangladesh Premier League (BPL). The tournament restarted on 20 December 2016 after the conclusion of the BPL.

Khulna Division retained their title when they beat Dhaka Metropolis by 398 runs in their final match. Dhaka Metropolis were relegated to Tier 2 for the next season, while Rangpur Division were promoted to Tier 1.

Following the conclusion of this tournament, the 2016–17 Bangladesh Cricket League began.

Squads

Fixtures

Tier 1
Points table

Tier 2
Points table

References

External links
 Series home at ESPN Cricinfo

2016-17
Bangladesh National Cricket League
2016 in Bangladeshi cricket
2017 in Bangladeshi cricket
Bangladeshi cricket seasons from 2000–01